Spithead is an area of the Solent and a roadstead off Gilkicker Point in Hampshire, England. It is protected from all winds except those from the southeast. Spithead has been strongly defended since 1864 by four Solent Forts, which complement the Fortifications of Portsmouth.

The Fleet Review is a British tradition that usually takes place at Spithead, where the monarch reviews the massed Royal Navy.

The Spithead mutiny occurred in 1797 in the Royal Navy fleet at anchor at Spithead. It is also the location where  sank in 1782 with the loss of more than 800 lives.

In popular culture
In the operetta H.M.S. Pinafore by Gilbert and Sullivan, the character "Buttercup" is referred to as "The rosiest, roundest, and reddest beauty in all Spithead".

In the book series about the naval officer Horatio Hornblower by C. S. Forester, the main protagonist starts off his career by becoming seasick in calm weather on Spithead.

References

External links
 

 Spithead Hampshire at A Vision of Britain

The Solent
Roadsteads of the United Kingdom